Dampier Strait (sometimes also known as Augusta's Strait) in the Indonesian province of Southwest Papua is a strait that separates the Raja Ampat islands of Waigeo and Batanta. It is named after British navigator William Dampier.

Geography 

The Dampier Strait passes through the Indonesian archipelago of Raja Ampat ( Southwest Papua ).  Between the islands Batanta and Gam are several islands.  The largest of these is the narrow island of Mansuar.  At its eastern tip are the islands of Kri and Koh.  Island Arborek lies northwest.  South of Mansuar are the Augusta Island, the Duiven Island, Djerief and the Mainsfield Islands.  At the western end of the strait are the Woodford Reefs and the Fam Islands.  Other small islands are located near the coast of the main islands.

References

Straits of Indonesia
Landforms of Southwest Papua 
Landforms of Western New Guinea